is a Japanese manga series written and illustrated by Yasushi Baba. It serves as a spin-off to Baba's previous series . It began serialization in Kodansha's Monthly Shōnen Sirius magazine in May 2018. As of October 2022, the series' individual chapters have been collected into nine volumes.

Publication
Written and illustrated by Yasushi Baba, the series began serialization in Kodansha's Monthly Shōnen Sirius magazine on May 26, 2018. As of October 2022, the series' individual chapters have been collected into nine tankōbon volumes.

At Anime Expo 2019, Sol Press announced that they licensed the series for English publication.

Volume list

Reception
In the 2019 Next Manga Award, the series ranked ninth in the print manga category. In the 2020 edition of the Kono Manga ga Sugoi! guidebook, the series ranked twelfth on the list of the top manga targeted at a male audience. Employees of the Japanese bookstore Honya Club ranked the series as the tenth best manga of 2020.

The series has sold 1.3 million copies.

Koiwai from Manga News praised the illustrations and story, especially for its use of the main character quirkiness. Faustine Lillaz from Planete BD liked the fight scenes and humor, though she worried that the series would have little overarching plot. The columnist for Manga Sanctuary liked the characters and their designs, the action sequences, and the setting, calling it unique among fantasy works.

References

External links
  
 

Action anime and manga
Isekai anime and manga
Kodansha manga
Shōnen manga